Monte Castelo is a municipality in Santa Catarina in the South region of Brazil.

See also
List of municipalities in Santa Catarina

References

Municipalities in Santa Catarina (state)